Rhynchospora tracyi, known by the common name of Tracy's beaksedge, is a member of the sedge family, Cyperaceae. It is a perennial herb, native to the Southeastern United States, the Bahamas, Cuba, Belize, and Honduras.

References

External links

tracyi
Flora of the Southeastern United States
Flora of the Bahamas
Flora of Belize
Flora of Cuba
Flora of Honduras
Flora of Louisiana
Flora of Texas
Plants described in 1860
Plants described in 1892